The Million Dollar Putt is a realistic fiction novel written by Dan Gutman in 2006. It is about a young blind child's quest to learn golf and win a million dollar prize.

Plot 

Edward Bogard ("Bogie" for short) is a 13-year-old blind boy who lives in Hawaii with his widowed father. Though blind, he rides a bike, parasails, and plays guitar. When he decides to take up golf he has to enlist the aid of his neighbor, a young girl named Birdie. As their friendship develops, it turns out that Bogie also has the driving touch of a professional golfer. Someone anonymously enters him into a golf tournament and the two join forces to try to win the million

Reviews 

School Library Journal stated that the "novel's appeal is enhanced by humorous, lively dialogue; the innocence of the main characters; and the positive portrayal of their relationship and disabilities."

Kliatt says that the author "has another winner here in this appealing sports tale about an unusual protagonist and the value of confronting one's fears."

Awards 

The book was nominated for the Mark Twain Award for 2009.

Series
Other novels in the series are The Million Dollar Shot (basketball), The Million Dollar Kick (soccer), The Million Dollar Goal (ice hockey), and The Million Dollar Strike (bowling). The books have different protagonists but a similar premise. In promotion of Gutman's new novel The Million Dollar Putt, Hyperion Books for Children republished the authors' previous four books in his Million Dollar series, hiring Michael Koelsch to illustrate new cover artworks for all five novels.

References 

2006 American novels
American children's novels

American sports novels
Novels about golf
Novels set in Hawaii
Novels about blindness
2006 children's books
Novels about diseases and disorders